Urmas Kaljend (born 24 July 1964) is a retired Estonian professional footballer, who played as a defender. He was affiliated with FC Norma Tallinn, SK Tallinna Sport and TVMK Tallinn. Kaljend also played in Finland, for IFK Mariehamn, KPV, LoPa, and FC Ilves.

International career
He won a total number of 20 international caps for the Estonia national football team during the 1990s, scoring no goals. Kaljend earned his first official cap as a substitute on 1992-06-03, when Estonia played Slovenia in a friendly match.

References

footballdatabase

1964 births
Living people
Estonian footballers
Estonia international footballers
Veikkausliiga players
FC Norma Tallinn players
IFK Mariehamn players
FC Ilves players
Footballers from Tallinn
Estonian expatriate footballers
Estonian expatriate sportspeople in Finland
Expatriate footballers in Finland
Association football defenders